Dry-Fly Fishing in Theory and Practice (1889) is British author and angler Frederic M. Halford's second and most influential book on dry fly fishing. It followed Floating Flies and How to Dress Them (1886) and this pair of books initiated some 40 years of a rigid, and sometimes dogmatic school, the Halfordian school, of dry fly fishing, especially on English chalk streams. The work also played a significant role in the development of dry-fly fishing in America.

Synopsis
Whereas Floating Flies and How to Dress Them was about the dry fly, fly tying and to some extent the entomology of the chalk stream, Dry-Fly Fishing... was about fishing the dry fly. It was the consummate "how-to" manual for the dry-fly fisherman. It was not only about methodology, but also about the ethics and purism of the dry fly on English chalk streams.

The volume begins by spelling out the various pieces of fishing and personal equipment the dry-fly angler should possess. The pros and cons of different rod styles are discussed, along with fly lines, reels and the various miscellany a fly angler should carry. Although Halford did not invent dry-fly fishing, before this volume, no one had laid out in such detail the equipment recommendations needed to be a successful dry-fly angler.

Such were Halford's recommendations that they were routinely referenced by the fly-fishing trade:

A short, but concise Chapter 2 discusses the distinction between a floating (dry) fly and a sunk fly, with emphasis on the superiority of the floating fly as characterized by this concluding statement:

Chapters 3-5 go into great detail about how, when and where to cast the dry fly on the typical chalk stream. These chapters are heavily illustrated with casting techniques and comprise nearly 20% of the entire 1st edition.

The bulk of the remaining chapters deal with the entomology of the chalk stream, fly selection and trout behaviour.

Reviews
In 1894 The New York Times wrote of Dry-Fly Fishing in Theory and Practice:

 At some point in his career, Halford's great antagonist, G. E. M. Skues wrote of Dry-Fly Fishing...:

In 1913, Emlyn M. Gill, writing for The New York Times said:

 In the foreword to the Centenary edition (1989), Dermot Wilson, a leading authority on UK dry-fly fishing, points to the prophetic nature of Halford's Dry-Fly Fishing:

Influence on American fly fishing
Theodore Gordon, the acknowledged "Father of American dry-fly fishing", wrote extensively about the influence Halford had on his views.

George M. La Branche in his seminal American fly fishing work The Dry Fly and Fast Water, wrote this of Halford's Dry-Fly Fishing:

Contents
 Chapter I – The Dry-Fly Fisherman's Gear
 Chapter II – Floating Flies and Sunk Flies
 Chapter III – How to Cast
 Chapter IV – Where to Cast
 Chapter V – When to Cast
 Chapter VI – Studies of Fish Feeding
 Chapter VII – Circumstances Affecting the Angler's Sport
 Chapter VIII – Selection of Fly
 Chapter IX – Evening Fishing
 Chapter X – Hooking, Playing and Landing
 Chapter XI – Autopsy
 Chapter XII – Trout or Grayling?
 Chapter XIII – The Management of a Fishery

Illustrations
 Frontispiece – Landing a Trout
 Plate I – Grip of the Rod
 Plate II – Over-handed Cast-Backward Position
 Plate III – Over-handed Cast-Coming Forward
 Plate IV – Over-handed Cast-Forward Position
 Plate V – Downward Cut-Forward Position
 Plate VI – Under-handed Cast-Backward Position
 Plate VII – Under-handed Cast-Coming Forward
 Plate VIII – Under-handed Cast-Forward Position
 Plate IX – Steeple-Cast-Recovering the Line
 Plate X – Steeple-Cast-Backward Position
 Plate XI – Steeple-Cast-Coming Forward
 Plate XII – Dry Switch-Commencement
 Plate XIII – Dry Switch-Finish
 Plate XIV – Where to Cast-Illustrative Plan
 Plate XV – Mayfly-Eggs, Larve and Nymph-Coloured
 Plate XVI – Larva and Nymph Magnified
 Plate XVII – Sub-imago and Imago-Coloured
 Plate XVIII – Sub-imago Male and Female-Magnified
 Plate XIX – Imago Female Magnified
 Plate XX – Mayfly-Imago Male Magnified
 Plate XXI – Autopsy-Longitudinal Section of Trout
 Plate XXII – Nymph of Ephemeride, Caddis and Shrimp-Coloured
 Plate XXIII – Nymph of Ephemeride Magnified
 Plate XXIV – Caddis arid Shrimp Magnified
 Plate XXV – Management of a Fishery-Illustrative Plan

Other editions
From Antiquarian Book Exchange

Further reading

See also
 Bibliography of fly fishing

Notes

1889 non-fiction books
Angling literature
Fly fishing literature
British books
Recreational fishing in the United Kingdom